Whakatōhea is a Māori iwi located in the eastern Bay of Plenty region of New Zealand.

The iwi is traditionally centred in the area around the town of Ōpōtiki. The traditional territorial lands extend eastwards from Ohiwa Harbour to Opape along the coastline, and inland to Matawai. These lands have long held an abundance of food resources, particularly seafood. Most of the marae of the iwi are located near the coast, historically to defend its marine resources.

In the 2006 Census, 12,072 people claimed an affiliation with Whakatōhea.

History

Pre-European history
One of Whakatōhea's earliest ancestors was Chief Tarawa and his brother Tuwharanui had been left behind when the Te Tohorā waka left Hawaiki, and so built Te Arautauta waka to join the rest of their people in New Zealand. They arrived at Paerātā, east of the Waiōtahe River. Tarawa released two pet tanahanaha fish into a spring on the eastern bluff above Waiotahe Beach, which came to be known as Ōpōtiki-mai-tawhiti. Tarawa continued up the Mōtū River and married Manawa-ki-aitu.

The tribe's next prominent ancestor was Tautūrangi of his own Te Wakanui tribe, who arrived with the Nukutere waka around 26 generations before 1900CE. It made landfall on a rocky cove and was moored to a flat white rock now known as Te Rangi. Tautūrangi then sailed the waka around to Te Kōtukutuku and went ashore, where he went up the Waiaua Valley to a high point named Kapuarangi where he installed his atua, Tamaīwaho.

Nine generations after the arrival of Nukutere, the next waka to arrive was Mātaatua which landed at Whakatāne with kūmara, and carried the ancestress Muriwai, the eldest daughter of Wekanui and Irākewa whose other two children, sons, were Toroa and Puhi. The three siblings also had a half brother, Tāneatua. It was these words that gave her the right to pull the waka back to safety, and from these words being spoken at the landing place that Whakatane gets its name. Toroa's daughter Wairaka was an ancestress of Ngāti Awa and Ngāi Tūhoe.

Muriwai's son Rēpanga went to Ōpōtiki and married Ngāpoupereta, their descendant Ruatakena became the ancestor of Ngāti Ruatakena. Muriwai's daughter Hine-i-kauia followed Rēpanga and married Tūtāmure, born eight generations after Tautūrangi's arrival in New Zealand. He established the eastern boundary between the tribes of Te Wakanui and Ngāi Tai at Tōrere, and inland from Te Rangi cove to Ōroi. He led an attack against Ngāti Kahungunu's pā at Maungakāhia to avenge the murder of his sister Tāneroa, murdered by her husband. Tautūrangi's attacks were so vicious that he broke his weapon, a mere, and had to swap it for another more durable mere made of whalebone. With this he smashed the heads of his enemies, and buried them in the ground. For this his people became known as Te Panenehu ("the buried heads").

Tautūrangi established the Poutōtara pā inland at Waiaua to defend against further attacks from Ngāti Kahungunu. The ancestral house at Omarumutu marae is named Tutamure and the dining room is named Hine-i-kauia, and behind the marae Tautūrangi occupied another pā on the Mākeo hill. Their descendants would become Te Whakatōhea.

Tautūrangi's western counterpart was Kahuki of the Whakatāne hapū. Kahuki conquered the nearby territory in revenge for the killing of his father Rongopopoia, after which he returned to Waiōtahe and constructed a pā close to the river. Whakatāne and Ngāti Raumoa, including the Te Ūpokorehe hapū, were living on Waiōtahe and Ōhiwa land which were under Kahuki's control. Te Ūpokorehe were subjected to attacks from Ngāti Awa on the western border, and sought refuge at Ōpōtiki. Ngāti Awa and their ally Ngāi Tūhoe would meet with Whakatōhea and their chief Te Rupe for one final battle at Ōhope. Te Rupe was able to boost his peoples' moral with the haka Te kōtiritiri te kōtaratara, and won the battle.

Before the arrival of the Europeans, the final, defining battle against Ngāi Tai was done at Awahou under Punāhamoa's leadership. Ngāi Tai's leader Tūterangikūrei was killed, and his head preserved as a trophy. Ngāi Tai were able to take Tūterangikūrei's head back in exchange for the pounamu adze Waiwharangi, which today is held in the Whakatāne Museum.

Modern history

The iwi initially had good relations with European settlers and Christian missionaries. However, in 1865, following the murder of German missionary Carl Völkner, and with increasing demands from European settlers for more land, Crown soldiers invaded Te Whakatōhea land. Almost 600 km2 of Whakatōhea land was confiscated by the Crown under the New Zealand Settlements Act of 1863.

During the twentieth century there was increasing recognition that Whakatōhea had suffered grievances at the hands of the Crown. In 1996, the New Zealand government signed a Deed of Settlement, acknowledging and apologising for the invasion and confiscation of Whakatōhea lands, and the subsequent economic, cultural and developmental devastation suffered by the iwi. Whakatōhea are presently preparing to negotiate a full settlement with the New Zealand government.

Tuiringa Manny Mokomoko, an activist for tūpuna who died in 1866, received a Royal Pardon in 1992 over wrongful confiscation of Māori land.

Hapū and marae

Whakatōhea consists of about 17,000 whānau belonging to six hapū.

The status of Te Ūpokorehe, a tribal group covering an area between Ohope and Ōpōtiki, is in dispute. It was included as a hapū within Whakatōhea when the Whakatōhea Maori Trust Board was established in 1952. Some consider it part of Whakatōhea and want it to be part of the iwi's Treaty of Waitangi settlement, while others consider it a separate iwi and want it to have its own Waitangi Tribunal hearing and settlement.

Governance

The Whakatōhea Māori Trust Board was established in 1952 to administer the assets of the iwi, and provides members with education, health services and training in various commercial fields. It is a charitable trust governed by two representatives from each of the six hapū, and based in Ōpōtiki. It is also accountable to the Minister of Maori Affairs and is governed by the Maori Trust Boards Act. The trust represents the tribe's fisheries interest under the Māori Fisheries Act 2004, and its aquaculture interests under the Māori Commercial Aquaculture Claims Settlement Act 2004. It represents the tribe during consultation on resource consent applications under the Resource Management Act 1991.

The Whakatōhea Pre-Settlement Claims Trust represents the tribe during Treaty of Waitangi settlement negotiations. The New Zealand Government recognised the trust's mandate to represent the iwi with an Agreement in Principle signed with the Crown on 18 August 2017. The trust is governed by one trustee elected from each of six hapū, one trustee appointed from each of eight marae, and an additional trustee appointed by Whakatōhea Māori Trust Board. The trust is administered by the same staff as the trust board, in the same offices in Ōpōtiki.

Roimata Marae say they aren't represented on the trusts and the trusts cannot act on their behalf.

The tribal area of Whakatōhea is located within the boundaries of Ōpōtiki District Council and Bay of Plenty Regional Council.

Media

Pan-tribal iwi station Sea 92FM broadcasts to members of Whakatōhea, Ngāitai and Te Whānau-ā-Apanui in the Ōpōtiki area. It operates the low-power Opotiki 88.1 FM, geared towards a young demographic.

Notable people

 Tuakana Aporotanga, tribal leader and ringatu tohunga
 Te Raumoa Balneavis, interpreter and administrator
 Whirimako Black, singer and actress
 Tangimoe Clay, weaver and textile artist
 Pāora Kīngi Delamere, carpenter and boat-builder
 Matiu Dickson, academic and politician
 George Gage, Ringatū minister
 Wira Gardiner, soldier, civil servant and writer
 Ākenehi Hei, nurse and midwife
 Kayla Imrie, canoeist
 Paratene Matchitt, sculpture and painter
 Gareeb Stephen Shalfoon, musician
 Charles Shelford, soldier
 Frank Shelford, rugby union player
 Matiu Te Auripo Te Hau, teacher and community leader
 Hira Te Popo, tribal leader
 Michael Walker, biologist

See also
 List of Māori iwi

References

External links
 Opotiki Information Centre

 
Iwi and hapū